The Fifth Estate is a socio-cultural reference to groupings of outlier viewpoints in contemporary society, and is most associated with bloggers, journalists publishing in non-mainstream media outlets, and the social media or "social license". The "Fifth" Estate extends the sequence of the three classical Estates of the Realm and the preceding Fourth Estate, essentially the mainstream press. The use of "fifth estate" dates to the 1960s counterculture, and in particular the influential The Fifth Estate, an underground newspaper first published in Detroit in 1965. Web-based technologies have enhanced the scope and power of the Fifth Estate far beyond the modest and boutique conditions of its beginnings.

Nimmo and Combs assert that political pundits constitute a Fifth Estate.  Media researcher Stephen D. Cooper argues that bloggers are the Fifth Estate. William Dutton has argued that the Fifth Estate is not simply the blogging community, nor an extension of the media, but 'networked individuals' enabled by the Internet, e.g. social media, in ways that can hold the other estates accountable.

Making reference to the medieval concept of "three estates of the realm" (clergy, nobility, and commoners) and to a more recently developed model of "four estates", which encompasses the media, Nayef Al-Rodhan introduces the weblogs (blogs) as a "fifth estate of the realm". Blogs have potential and real influence on contemporary policy-making, especially in the context of elections, reporting from conflict zones, and raising dissent over corporate or legislative policies. Based on these observations, Al-Rodhan suggests moving beyond traditional thinking that limits the “estates of the realm” to governmental action and proposes a broader perspective in which civilians or anyone with access to a computer and the Internet can contribute to the global political change and security.

Blogs and social media as a Fifth Estate

Of all the blogs on the Internet, continues Al-Rodhan, only a few have a real power to influence the policy-making process, specifically political and current affairs blogs with large and involved audiences. These blogs can help organize the public to take a stance on an issue, be used in political campaigns, help cultivate grassroots movements, and assist in fundraising. Furthermore, blogs have several unique features that give them potential influence in policy making: a lack of editorial supervision, low barriers to entry, difficulty for governments to censor or control content, and the ease of responding to events in real time. Blogs can affect policy-making by providing insider information, facilitating communication between experts, promoting grassroots efforts, discrediting political figures, and setting policy agendas. Al-Rodhan concludes, governments must increase surveillance of blogs and develop legal, administrative, and technological tools to dissuade bloggers from posting potentially harmful information, such as calls to incite terrorism. On a more positive note, blogs have also the potential to prevent governments from adopting hasty and misjudged decisions.

Building on this work, Wallsten empirically assessed the impact of political bloggers as a "fifth estate" during the 2004 US presidential campaign. Specifically, he used time-series analysis to determine the extent to which political bloggers followed the mainstream media's agenda or set the mainstream media's agenda. He found that there was
a complex, bidirectional relationship between mainstream media coverage and blog discussion rather than
a unidirectional media or blog agenda setting effect.

In a speech at Georgetown University on October 17, 2019, Mark Zuckerberg gave a description of social media and the power it gives to people:"People having the power to express themselves at scale is a new kind of force in the world — a 'Fifth Estate' alongside the other power structures of society. People no longer have to rely on traditional gatekeepers in politics or media to make their voices heard, and that has important consequences. I understand the concerns about how tech platforms have centralized power, but I actually believe the much bigger story is how much these platforms have decentralized power by putting it directly into people’s hands."

See also
Fourth branch of government
Fifth power
Gossip

References

Social media
Social influence
Information society
Influence of mass media
Journalism